Nura Musa Inuwa also called M Inuwa (1989– ) is a Hausa musician, artist and film producer. He was born, raised and educated in Kano State in the town of Gwammaja in Dala Local Government Area, Kano.

Career
Most of his songs were used in Kannywood films. He has over 500 songs. He associates with Umar Sharif, together they released an album called Rarrashi. A Kannywood actor Adam A Zango was also his close friend in Kannywood film industry. He portrayed Nura M inuwa in a film called Rigar Aro. In 2019 he sang a campaign song to opposition candidate Alhaji Atiku Abubakar, the former Vice President of the Federal Republic of Nigeria. In the year 2012 battery acid was poured on his face, unknown person call him to come and meet him in sharada, he told him he want to sang him a song for his wedding, his bride ask him to give Nura M inuwa contract of their wedding song, when he arrived, they poured him acid on his face, which lead to the destruction of his left eye, the criminals were unknown.

Discography
Aisha Humaira, Rai-dai, Badi ba rai, Soyayyar facebook, Sayyada, Mijin Biza, Abinda Yake Ruhi, Alkuki, Yan Kudu, Zurfin Ciki, Soyayyace, Faggen Soyayya, inka iya zance, Ga wuri ga waina, Ummi, Babban gida, Dan gwamna, Manyanmata, Hubbi, Matan Zamani, Ɗan Baiwa, Basaja, Zurfin Ciki, Abbana, Alkawari, Dawo dawo, Wata Ruga, Yar Fulani, Salma, Mai Gadan Zinare, Labarina, Yan Arewa, Duniyar Masoya, Mailaya, In Kaiya Zance, Daren Alkhairi.

Albums

See also
List of Hausa people

References 

Nigerian musicians
Hausa-language singers
1989 births
Living people
People from Kano State
Hausa people
Nigerian film producers
Nigerian artists